The 1828–29 United States House of Representatives elections were held on various dates in various states between July 9, 1828 and October 5, 1829. Each state set its own date for its elections to the House of Representatives before the first session of the 21st United States Congress convened on December 7, 1829. Elections were held for all 213 seats, representing 24 states.

They occurred while Jacksonians soundly took control of the presidency, with Andrew Jackson's victory, they greatly increased their majority in Congress. Outgoing President John Quincy Adams's unpopularity played a major role in the Jacksonian pick-up, as did the perception of the Anti-Jacksonian Party as urban and elitist. Major increases in suffrage also heightened Jacksonian wins, as newly enfranchised voters tended to associate with Jacksonian principles. The Anti-Masonic Party, a single issue faction based on distrust of Freemasonry, became the first third party in American history to garner seats in the House.

Election summaries

Special elections 

There were special elections in 1828 and 1829 to the 20th United States Congress and 21st United States Congress.

Special elections are sorted by date then district.

20th Congress 

|-
! 
| William Haile
|  | Jacksonian
| 1826 1826
|  | Incumbent resigned September 12, 1828, having lost re-election to the next term.New member elected October 20, 1828.Jacksonian hold.Winner was seated December 8, 1828.Successor had already been elected to the next term, see below.
| nowrap | 

|-
! 
| Henry W. Conway
|  | None
| 1823
|  | Incumbent died November 9, 1827.New member elected (on an unknown date).Jacksonian gain.Successor seated February 13, 1828.
| nowrap | 

|-
! rowspan=2 | 
| George Holcombe
|  | Jacksonian
| 1820
|  | Incumbent died January 14, 1828.New member elected November 4, 1828.Anti-Jacksonian gain.Successor seated December 1, 1828.Successor was not a candidate for election to the next term on the same day, see below.
| rowspan=2 nowrap | 

|-
| Hedge Thompson
|  | Anti-Jacksonian
| 1826
|  | Incumbent died July 23, 1828.New member elected November 4, 1828.Anti-Jacksonian hold.Successor seated December 1, 1828.Successor was also elected to the next term on the same day, see below.

|-
! 
| Thomas J. Oakley
|  | Jacksonian
| 1826
|  | Incumbent resigned June 1, 1828, to become Governor of Kentucky.New member elected (on an unknown date).Jacksonian hold.Successor seated November 5, 1828.
| nowrap | 

|-
! 
| Thomas Metcalfe
|  | Anti-Jacksonian
| 1818
|  | Incumbent resigned June 1, 1828, to become Governor of Kentucky.New member elected (on an unknown date).Anti-Jacksonian hold.Successor seated December 1, 1828.Successor had not been a candidate the day before to the next term, see below.
| nowrap | 

|-
! 
| William Creighton Jr.
|  | Anti-Jacksonian
| 1826
|  | Incumbent resigned before December 19, 1828, to become judge to district court.New member elected December 2, 1828.Anti-Jacksonian hold.Successor seated December 19, 1828.
| nowrap | 

|}

21st Congress 

|-
! 
| Peleg Sprague
|  | Anti-Jacksonian
| 1825
|  | Incumbent resigned in previous Congress.New member elected July 20, 1829 on the second ballot.Anti-Jacksonian hold.Successor seated December 7, 1829.
| nowrap | 

|-
! 
| George R. Gilmer
|  | Jacksonian
| 1820[[1827 Georgia's 1st congressional district special election|1827 
|  | Incumbent failed to accept the position within the legal time frame.New member elected October 5, 1829.Jacksonian hold.Successor seated December 7, 1829.
| nowrap | 

|-
! rowspan=2 | 
| George Wolf
|  | Jacksonian
| 1824 
|  | Incumbent resigned in 1829 before the convening of Congress.New member elected October 13, 1829.Jacksonian hold.Successor seated December 7, 1829.
| rowspan=2 nowrap | 
|-
| Samuel D. Ingham
|  | Jacksonian
| 18121818 1822 
|  | Incumbent resigned in March 1829 to become U.S. Secretary of the Treasury.New member elected October 13, 1829.Jacksonian hold.Successor seated October 13, 1829.

|-
! 
| Gabriel Holmes
|  | Jacksonian
| 1825
|  | Incumbent died September 26, 1829.New member elected December 2, 1829.Jacksonian hold.Successor seated December 14, 1829.
| nowrap | 

|-
! 
| John Giles
|  | Jacksonian
| 1829
|  | Incumbent had just been elected August 13, 1829, to the term beginning March 4, 1829, but resigned from the seat without having served.New member elected December 2, 1829.Jacksonian hold.Successor seated December 7, 1829.
| nowrap | 

|-
! 
| William Wilkins
|  | Jacksonian
| 1828
|  | Incumbent resigned before qualifying.New member elected December 15, 1829.Anti-Masonic gain.Successor seated December 30, 1829.
| nowrap | 

|-
! 
| William C. Rives
|  | Jacksonian
| 1823
|  | Incumbent resigned some time in 1829.New member elected in August 1829.Jacksonian hold.Successor seated January 25, 1830.
| nowrap | 

|}

Alabama 

Alabama elected its members August 3, 1829, after the term began but before Congress convened.

|-
! 
| Gabriel Moore
|  | Jacksonian
| 1821
|  | Incumbent retired.New member elected.Jacksonian hold.
| nowrap | 

|-
! 
| John McKee
|  | Jacksonian
| 1823
|  | Incumbent retired.New member elected.Jacksonian hold.
| nowrap | 

|-
! 
| George W. Owen
|  | Jacksonian
| 1823
|  | Incumbent retired.New member elected.Jacksonian hold.
| nowrap | 

|}

Arkansas Territory 
See Non-voting delegates, below.

Connecticut 

Connecticut elected its members April 29, 1829, after the term began but before Congress convened.

|-
! rowspan=6 | 
| David Plant
|  | Anti-Jacksonian
| 1827
|  | Incumbent lost re-election.New member elected.Anti-Jacksonian hold.
| nowrap rowspan=6 | 

|-
| Elisha Phelps
|  | Anti-Jacksonian
| 18181820 1825
|  | Incumbent lost re-election.New member elected.Anti-Jacksonian hold.

|-
| Ralph I. Ingersoll
|  | Anti-Jacksonian
| 1825
| Incumbent re-elected.

|-
| Orange Merwin
|  | Anti-Jacksonian
| 1825
|  | Incumbent lost re-election.New member elected.Anti-Jacksonian hold.

|-
| Noyes Barber
|  | Anti-Jacksonian
| 1821
| Incumbent re-elected.

|-
| John Baldwin
|  | Anti-Jacksonian
| 1825
|  | Incumbent retired.New member elected.Anti-Jacksonian hold.

|}

Delaware 

Delaware re-elected its sole member October 7, 1828.

|-
! 
| Kensey Johns Jr.
|  | Anti-Jacksonian
| 1827 
| Incumbent re-elected.
| nowrap | 

|}

Florida Territory 
See Non-voting delegates, below.

Georgia 

Georgia returned to electing its members at-large for the 1828 election and elected its members October 6, 1828.  Despite two retirements, the entire delegation remained Jacksonians.

|-
! rowspan=7 | 
| George R. Gilmer
|  | Jacksonian
| 1820(1827 Special)
| Incumbent re-elected but failed to accept the position within the legal time frame and the governor ordered a new election.
| nowrap rowspan=7 | 

|-
| Richard Henry Wilde
|  | Jacksonian
| 18141816 1824 1826 1827 
| Incumbent re-elected.

|-
| Wiley Thompson
|  | Jacksonian
| 1820
| Incumbent re-elected.

|-
| Wilson Lumpkin
|  | Jacksonian
| 18141816 1826
| Incumbent re-elected.

|-
| Charles E. Haynes
|  | Jacksonian
| 1824
| Incumbent re-elected.

|-
| Tomlinson Fort
|  | Jacksonian
| 1826
|  | Incumbent retired.New member elected.Jacksonian hold.

|-
| John Floyd
|  | Jacksonian
| 1826
|  | Incumbent retired.New member elected.Jacksonian hold.

|}

Illinois 

Illinois's sole member was re-elected August 4, 1828.

|-
! 
| Joseph Duncan
|  | Jacksonian
| 1826
| Incumbent re-elected.
| nowrap | 

|}

Indiana 

Indiana elected its members August 4, 1828.

|-
! 
| Thomas H. Blake
|  | Anti-Jacksonian
| 1826
|  | Incumbent lost re-election.New member elected.Jacksonian gain.
| nowrap | 

|-
! 
| Jonathan Jennings
|  | Anti-Jacksonian
| 1822 
| Incumbent re-elected.
| nowrap | 

|-
! 
| Oliver H. Smith
|  | Jacksonian
| 1826
|  | Incumbent retired.New member elected.Anti-Jacksonian gain.
| nowrap | 

|}

Kentucky 

Kentucky elected its members August 3, 1829, after the term began but before the new Congress convened.

|-
! 
| Henry Daniel
|  | Jacksonian
| 1827
| Incumbent re-elected.
| nowrap | 

|-
! 
| Thomas Metcalfe
|  | Anti-Jacksonian
| 1818
|  | Incumbent resigned June 1, 1828, to become Governor of Kentucky.New member elected.Jacksonian gain.Successor lost election to finish the current term, the next day.
| nowrap | 

|-
! 
| James Clark
|  | Anti-Jacksonian
| 18121816 1825 
| Incumbent re-elected.
| nowrap | 

|-
! 
| Robert P. Letcher
|  | Anti-Jacksonian
| 1822
| Incumbent re-elected.
| nowrap | 

|-
! 
| Robert L. McHatton
|  | Jacksonian
| 1826 
|  | Incumbent lost re-election.New member elected.Jacksonian hold.
| nowrap | 

|-
! 
| Joseph Lecompte
|  | Jacksonian
| 1824
| Incumbent re-elected.
| nowrap | 

|-
! 
| Thomas P. Moore
|  | Jacksonianian
| 1822
|  | Incumbent retired.New member elected.Jacksonian hold.
| nowrap | 

|-
! 
| Richard A. Buckner
|  | Anti-Jacksonian
| 1822
|  | Incumbent retired.New member elected.Jacksonian gain.
| nowrap | 

|-
! 
| Charles A. Wickliffe
|  | Jacksonian
| 1822
| Incumbent re-elected.
| nowrap | 

|-
! 
| Joel Yancey
|  | Jacksonian
| 1827
| Incumbent re-elected.
| nowrap | 

|-
! 
| Thomas Chilton
|  | Jacksonian
| 1827 
| Incumbent re-elected.
| nowrap | 

|-
! 
| Chittenden Lyon
|  | Jacksonian
| 1827
| Incumbent re-elected.
| nowrap | 

|}

Louisiana 

Louisiana elected its members July 8–10, 1828.

|-
! 
| Edward Livingston
|  | Jacksonian
| 1822
|  | Incumbent lost re-election.New member elected.Anti-Jacksonian gain.
| nowrap | 

|-
! 
| Henry H. Gurley
|  | Anti-Jacksonian
| 1822
| Incumbent re-elected.
| nowrap | 

|-
! 
| William L. Brent
|  | Anti-Jacksonian
| 1822
|  | Incumbent retired.New member elected.Jacksonian gain.
| nowrap | 

|}

Maine 

Maine elected its members September 8, 1828.  Maine required a majority vote for election, so the  district election was settled on the second ballot on December 22, 1828, and the  district election was settled on the sixth ballot on April 5, 1830, near the end of the next Congress.

|-
! 
| Rufus McIntire
|  | Jacksonian
| 1827 
| Incumbent re-elected.
| nowrap | 

|-
! 
| John Anderson
|  | Jacksonian
| 1824
| Incumbent re-elected.
| nowrap | 

|-
! 
| Joseph F. Wingate
|  | Anti-Jacksonian
| 1826
| Incumbent re-elected.
| nowrap | 

|-
! 
| Peleg Sprague
|  | Anti-Jacksonian
| 1824
| Incumbent re-elected.Incumbent resigned March 3, 1829, when elected U.S. Senator, leading to a special election.
| nowrap | 

|-
! 
| James W. Ripley
|  | Jacksonian
| 1826
| Incumbent re-elected.
| nowrap |   

|-
! 
| Jeremiah O'Brien
|  | Anti-Jacksonian
| 1823
|  | Incumbent lost re-election as a Jacksonian.New member elected.Jacksonian gain.
|       

|-
! 
| Samuel Butman
|  | Anti-Jacksonian
| 1827
| Incumbent re-elected.
| nowrap | 

|}

Maryland 

Maryland elected its members October 5, 1829, after the term began but before Congress convened.

|-
! 
| Clement Dorsey
|  | Anti-Jacksonian
| 1824
| Incumbent re-elected.
| nowrap | 

|-
! 
| John C. Weems
|  | Jacksonian
| 1826 
|  | Incumbent lost re-election.New member elected.Anti-Jacksonian gain.
| nowrap | 

|-
! 
| George C. Washington
|  | Anti-Jacksonian
| 1826
| Incumbent re-elected.
| nowrap | 

|-
! 
| Michael C. Sprigg
|  | Jacksonian
| 1826
| Incumbent re-elected.
| nowrap | 

|-
! rowspan=2 | 
| John Barney
|  | Anti-Jacksonian
| 1824
|  | Incumbent lost re-election.New member elected.Jacksonian gain.
| nowrap rowspan=2 | 

|-
| Peter Little
|  | Anti-Jacksonian
| 18101812 1816
|  | Incumbent lost re-election.New member elected.Jacksonian gain.

|-
! 
| Levin Gale
|  | Jacksonian
| 1826
|  | Incumbent retired.New member elected.Jacksonian hold.
| nowrap | 

|-
! 
| John Leeds Kerr
|  | Anti-Jacksonian
| 1824
|  | Incumbent lost re-election.New member elected.Jacksonian gain.
| nowrap | 

|-
! 
| Ephraim K. Wilson
|  | Anti-Jacksonian
| 1826
| Incumbent re-elected.
| nowrap | 

|}

Massachusetts 

Massachusetts elected its members November 7, 1828.

The majority requirement for election was met on the first ballot in all of the 13 districts.

District numbers vary between sources.

|-
! 
| Benjamin Gorham
|  | Anti-Jacksonian
| 1820 1827 
| Incumbent re-elected.
| nowrap | 

|-
! 
| Benjamin W. Crowninshield
|  | Anti-Jacksonian
| 1822
| Incumbent re-elected.
| nowrap | 

|-
! 
| John Varnum
|  | Anti-Jacksonian
| 1824
| Incumbent re-elected.
| nowrap | 

|-
! 
| Edward Everett
|  | Anti-Jacksonian
| 1824
| Incumbent re-elected.
| nowrap | 

|-
! 
| John Davis
|  | Anti-Jacksonian
| 1824
| Incumbent re-elected.
| nowrap | 

|-
! 
| John Locke
|  | Anti-Jacksonian
| 1822
|  | Incumbent lost re-election.New member elected.Anti-Jacksonian hold.
| nowrap | 

|-
! 
| Samuel C. Allen
|  | Anti-Jacksonian
| 1816
|  | Incumbent lost re-election.New member elected.Anti-Jacksonian hold.
| nowrap | 

|-
! 
| Isaac C. Bates
|  | Anti-Jacksonian
| 1826
| Incumbent re-elected.
| nowrap | 

|-
! 
| Henry W. Dwight
|  | Anti-Jacksonian
| 1820
| Incumbent re-elected.
| nowrap | 

|-
! 
| John Bailey
|  | Anti-Jacksonian
| 1822
| Incumbent re-elected.
| nowrap | 

|-
! 
| Joseph Richardson
|  | Anti-Jacksonian
| 1826
| Incumbent re-elected.
| nowrap | 

|-
! 
| James L. Hodges
|  | Anti-Jacksonian
| 1826
| Incumbent re-elected.
| nowrap | 

|-
! 
| John Reed Jr.
|  | Anti-Jacksonian
| 18121816 1820
| Incumbent re-elected.
| nowrap | 

|}

Michigan Territory 
See Non-voting delegates, below.

Mississippi 

Mississippi elected its sole member at-large August 4–5, 1828.

|-
! 
| William Haile
|  | Jacksonian
| 1826 
|  | Incumbent lost re-election.New member elected.Jacksonian hold.Incumbent then resigned September 12, 1828, leading to a special election to finish the term, which was also won by the successor to the next term.
| nowrap | 

|}

Missouri 

Missouri elected its sole member August 4, 1828.

|-
! 
| Edward Bates
|  | Anti-Jacksonian
| 1820
|  | Incumbent lost re-election.New member elected.Jacksonian gain.
| nowrap | 

|}

New Hampshire 

New Hampshire elected its members March 10, 1829, after the term began but before Congress convened.

|-
! rowspan=6 | 
| Ichabod Bartlett
|  | Anti-Jacksonian
| 1822
|  | Incumbent retired.New member elected.Jacksonian gain.
| nowrap rowspan=6 | 

|-
| Jonathan Harvey
|  | Jacksonian
| 1824
| Incumbent re-elected.

|-
| Titus Brown
|  | Anti-Jacksonian
| 1824
|  | Incumbent retired.New member elected.Jacksonian gain.

|-
| David Barker Jr.
|  | Anti-Jacksonian
| 1827
|  | Incumbent lost re-election.New member elected.Jacksonian gain.

|-
| Thomas Whipple Jr.
|  | Anti-Jacksonian
| 1820
|  | Incumbent retired.New member elected.Jacksonian gain.

|-
| Joseph Healy
|  | Anti-Jacksonian
| 1824
|  | Incumbent retired.New member elected.Jacksonian gain.

|}

New Jersey 

New Jersey elected its members November 4, 1828.

|-
! rowspan=6 | 
| Lewis Condict
|  | Anti-Jacksonian
| 1820
| Incumbent re-elected.
| nowrap rowspan=6 | 

|-
| George Holcombe
|  | Jacksonian
| 1820
|  | Incumbent died January 14, 1828.New member elected.Jacksonian hold.

|-
| Isaac Pierson
|  | Anti-Jacksonian
| 1826
| Incumbent re-elected.

|-
| Samuel Swan
|  | Anti-Jacksonian
| 1820
| Incumbent re-elected.

|-
| Hedge Thompson
|  | Anti-Jacksonian
| 1826
|  | Incumbent died July 23, 1828.New member elected.Anti-Jacksonian gain.

|-
| Ebenezer Tucker
|  | Anti-Jacksonian
| 1824
|  | Incumbent retired.New member elected.Anti-Jacksonian hold.

|}

New York 

New York elected its members November 3–5, 1828.

|-
! 
| Silas Wood
|  | Anti-Jacksonian
| 1818
|  | Incumbent lost re-election.New member elected.Jacksonian gain.
| nowrap | 

|-
! 
| John J. Wood
|  | Jacksonian
| 1826
|  | Incumbent retired.New member elected.Jacksonian hold.
| nowrap | 

|-
! rowspan=3 | 
| Churchill C. Cambreleng
|  | Jacksonian
| 1821
| Incumbent re-elected.
| nowrap rowspan=3 | 

|-
| Gulian Verplanck
|  | Jacksonian
| 1824
| Incumbent re-elected.

|-
| Jeromus Johnson
|  | Jacksonian
| 1824
|  | Incumbent retired.New member elected.Jacksonian hold.

|-
! 
| Aaron Ward
|  | Anti-Jacksonian
| 1824
|  | Incumbent retired.New member elected.Anti-Jacksonian hold.
| nowrap | 

|-
! 
| Thomas J. Oakley
|  | Jacksonian
| 1826
|  | Incumbent resigned May 9, 1828, to become a judge of the superior court of New York City.New member elected.Jacksonian hold.
| nowrap | 

|-
! 
| John Hallock Jr.
|  | Jacksonian
| 1824
|  | Incumbent retired.New member elected.Jacksonian hold.
| nowrap | 

|-
! 
| George O. Belden
|  | Jacksonian
| 1826
|  | Incumbent retired.New member elected.Jacksonian hold.
| nowrap | 

|-
! 
| James Strong
|  | Anti-Jacksonian
| 18181821 1822
| Incumbent re-elected.
| nowrap | 

|-
! 
| John D. Dickinson
|  | Anti-Jacksonian
| 18181822 1826
| Incumbent re-elected.
| nowrap | 

|-
! 
| Stephen Van Rensselaer
|  | Anti-Jacksonian
| 1822 
|  | Incumbent retired.New member elected.Anti-Jacksonian hold.
| nowrap | 

|-
! 
| Selah R. Hobbie
|  | Jacksonian
| 1826
|  | Incumbent retired.New member elected.Jacksonian hold.
| nowrap | 

|-
! 
| John I. De Graff
|  | Jacksonian
| 1826
|  | Incumbent retired.New member elected.Jacksonian hold.
| nowrap | 

|-
! 
| Samuel Chase
|  | Anti-Jacksonian
| 1826
|  | Incumbent retired.New member elected.Jacksonian gain.
| nowrap | 

|-
! 
| Henry R. Storrs
|  | Anti-Jacksonian
| 18161821 1822
| Incumbent re-elected.
| nowrap | 

|-
! 
| Michael Hoffman
|  | Jacksonian
| 1824
| Incumbent re-elected.
| nowrap | 

|-
! 
| Henry Markell
|  | Anti-Jacksonian
| 1824
|  | Incumbent retired.New member elected.Anti-Jacksonian hold.
| nowrap | 

|-
! 
| John W. Taylor
|  | Anti-Jacksonian
| 1812
| Incumbent re-elected.
| nowrap | 

|-
! 
| Henry C. Martindale
|  | Anti-Jacksonian
| 1822
| Incumbent re-elected.
| nowrap | 

|-
! 
| Richard Keese
|  | Jacksonian
| 1826
|  | Incumbent retired.New member elected.Anti-Jacksonian gain.
| nowrap | 

|-
! rowspan=2 | 
| Rudolph Bunner
|  | Jacksonian
| 1826
|  | Incumbent retired.New member elected.Anti-Jacksonian gain.
| nowrap rowspan=2 | 

|-
| Silas Wright Jr.
|  | Jacksonian
| 1826
|  | Incumbent lost re-election.New member elected.Anti-Jacksonian gain.The losing incumbent later successfully contested the election but Wright never claimed the seat and resigned without serving on March 9, 1830.

|-
! 
| John C. Clark
|  | Jacksonian
| 1826
|  | Incumbent retired.New member elected.Jacksonian hold.
| nowrap | 

|-
! 
| John G. Stower
|  | Jacksonian
| 1824
|  | Incumbent lost re-election.New member elected.Anti-Jacksonian gain.
| nowrap | 

|-
! 
| Jonas Earll Jr.
|  | Jacksonian
| 1826
| Incumbent re-elected.
| nowrap | 

|-
! 
| Nathaniel Garrow
|  | Jacksonian
| 1826
|  | Incumbent retired.New member elected.Jacksonian hold.
| nowrap | 

|-
! 
| David Woodcock
|  | Anti-Jacksonian
| 18211824 1826
|  | Incumbent lost re-election.New member elected.Jacksonian gain.
| nowrap | 

|-
! rowspan=2 | 
| Dudley Marvin
|  | Anti-Jacksonian
| 1822
|  | Incumbent lost re-election.New member elected.Anti-Masonic gain.
| nowrap rowspan=2 | 

|-
| John Maynard
|  | Anti-Jacksonian
| 1826
|  | Incumbent retired.New member elected.Jacksonian gain.

|-
! 
| Daniel D. Barnard
|  | Anti-Jacksonian
| 1826
|  | Incumbent lost re-election.New member elected.Anti-Masonic gain.
| nowrap | 

|-
! 
| John Magee
|  | Jacksonian
| 1826
| Incumbent re-elected.
| nowrap | 

|-
! 
| Phineas L. Tracy
|  | Anti-Jacksonian
| 1827 
|  | Incumbent re-elected to a new party.Anti-Masonic gain.
| nowrap | 

|-
! 
| Daniel G. Garnsey
|  | Jacksonian
| 1824
|  | Incumbent lost re-election as Anti-Masonic.New member elected.Jacksonian hold.
| nowrap | 

|}

North Carolina 

North Carolina elected its members August 13, 1829, after the term began but before Congress convened.

|-
! 
| Lemuel Sawyer
|  | Jacksonian
| 18061812 18171823 1825
|  | Incumbent lost re-election.New member elected.Anti-Jacksonian gain.
| nowrap | 

|-
! 
| Willis Alston
|  | Jacksonian
| 17981815 1825
| Incumbent re-elected.
| nowrap | 

|-
! 
| Thomas H. Hall
|  | Jacksonian
| 18171825 1827
| Incumbent re-elected.
| nowrap | 

|-
! 
| John H. Bryan
|  | Anti-Jacksonian
| 1825
|  | Incumbent retired.New member elected.Jacksonian gain.
| nowrap | 

|-
! 
| Gabriel Holmes
|  | Jacksonian
| 1825
| Incumbent re-elected.Incumbent later died September 26, 1829, and was replaced in a special election.
| nowrap | 

|-
! 
| Daniel Turner
|  | Jacksonian
| 1827
|  | Incumbent retired.New member elected.Jacksonian hold.
| nowrap | 

|-
! 
| John Culpepper
|  | Anti-Jacksonian
| 18061808 1808 18131816 18191821 18231825 1827
|  | Incumbent retired.New member elected.Anti-Jacksonian hold.
| nowrap | 

|-
! 
| Daniel L. Barringer
|  | Jacksonian
| 1826 
| Incumbent re-elected.
| nowrap | 

|-
! 
| Augustine H. Shepperd
|  | Jacksonian
| 1827
| Incumbent re-elected.
| nowrap | 

|-
! 
| John Long
|  | Anti-Jacksonian
| 1821
|  | Incumbent lost re-election.New member elected.Jacksonian gain.New member later resigned, leading to a December 2, 1829 special election.
| nowrap | 

|-
! 
| Henry W. Connor
|  | Jacksonian
| 1821
| Incumbent re-elected.
| nowrap | 

|-
! 
| Samuel P. Carson
|  | Jacksonian
| 1825
| Incumbent re-elected.
| nowrap | 

|-
! 
| Lewis Williams
|  | Anti-Jacksonian
| 1815
| Incumbent re-elected.
| nowrap | 

|}

Ohio 

Ohio elected its members October 14, 1828.

|-
! 
| James Findlay
|  | Jacksonian
| 1824
| Incumbent re-elected.
| nowrap | 

|-
! 
| John Woods
|  | Anti-Jacksonian
| 1824
|  | Incumbent lost re-election.New member elected.Jacksonian gain.
| nowrap | 

|-
! 
| William McLean
|  | Anti-Jacksonian
| 1822
|  | Incumbent retired.New member elected.Anti-Jacksonian hold.
| nowrap | 

|-
! 
| Joseph Vance
|  | Anti-Jacksonian
| 1820
| Incumbent re-elected.
| nowrap | 

|-
! 
| William Russell
|  | Jacksonian
| 1826
| Incumbent re-elected.
| nowrap | 

|-
! 
| William Creighton Jr.
|  | Anti-Jacksonian
| 1826
| Incumbent re-elected.
| nowrap | 

|-
! 
| Samuel F. Vinton
|  | Anti-Jacksonian
| 1822
| Incumbent re-elected.
| nowrap | 

|-
! 
| William Stanbery
|  | Jacksonian
| 1827 
| Incumbent re-elected.
| nowrap | 

|-
! 
| Philemon Beecher
|  | Anti-Jacksonian
| 18161820 1822
|  | Incumbent lost re-election.New member elected.Jacksonian gain.
| nowrap | 

|-
! 
| John Davenport
|  | Anti-Jacksonian
| 1826
|  | Incumbent lost re-election.New member elected.Jacksonian gain.
| nowrap | 

|-
! 
| John C. Wright
|  | Anti-Jacksonian
| 1822
|  | Incumbent lost re-election.New member elected.Jacksonian gain.
| nowrap | 

|-
! 
| John Sloane
|  | Anti-Jacksonian
| 1818
|  | Incumbent lost re-election.New member elected.Jacksonian gain.
| nowrap | 

|-
! 
| Elisha Whittlesey
|  | Anti-Jacksonian
| 1822
| Incumbent re-elected.
| nowrap | 

|-
! 
| Mordecai Bartley
|  | Anti-Jacksonian
| 1822
| Incumbent re-elected.
| nowrap | 

|}

Pennsylvania 

Pennsylvania elected its members October 14, 1828.

Rhode Island 

Rhode Island elected its members August 27, 1829, after the term began but before Congress convened.

|-
! rowspan=2 | 
| Dutee J. Pearce
|  | Anti-Jacksonian
| 1825
| Incumbent re-elected.
| nowrap rowspan=2 | 

|-
| Tristam Burges
|  | Anti-Jacksonian
| 1825
| Incumbent re-elected.

|}

South Carolina 

South Carolina elected its members October 13–14, 1828.

|-
! 
| William Drayton
|  | Jacksonian
| 1825 
| Incumbent re-elected.
| nowrap | 

|-
! 
| James Hamilton Jr.
|  | Jacksonian
| 1822 
|  | Incumbent retired.New member elected.Jacksonian hold.
| nowrap | 

|-
! 
| Thomas R. Mitchell
|  | Jacksonian
| 18201823 1824
|  | Incumbent lost re-election.New member elected.Jacksonian hold.
| nowrap | 

|-
! 
| William D. Martin
|  | Jacksonian
| 1826
| Incumbent re-elected.
| nowrap | 

|-
! 
| George McDuffie
|  | Jacksonian
| 1820
| Incumbent re-elected.
| nowrap | 

|-
! 
| Warren R. Davis
|  | Jacksonian
| 1826
| Incumbent re-elected.
| nowrap | 

|-
! 
| William T. Nuckolls
|  | Jacksonian
| 1826
| Incumbent re-elected.
| nowrap | 

|-
! 
| John Carter
|  | Jacksonian
| 1822 
|  | Incumbent retired.New member elected.Jacksonian hold.
| nowrap | 

|-
! 
| Starling Tucker
|  | Jacksonian
| 1816
| Incumbent re-elected.
| nowrap | 

|}

Tennessee 

Tennessee elected its members August 6–7, 1829 after the term began but before Congress convened.

|-
! 
| John Blair
|  | Jacksonian
| 1823
| Incumbent re-elected.
| nowrap | 

|-
! 
| Pryor Lea
|  | Jacksonian
| 1827
| Incumbent re-elected.
| nowrap | 

|-
! 
| James C. Mitchell
|  | Jacksonian
| 1825
|  | Incumbent retired.New member elected.Jacksonian hold.
| nowrap | 

|-
! 
| Jacob C. Isacks
|  | Jacksonian
| 1823
| Incumbent re-elected.
| nowrap | 

|-
! 
| Robert Desha
|  | Jacksonian
| 1827
| Incumbent re-elected.
| nowrap | 

|-
! 
| James K. Polk
|  | Jacksonian
| 1825
| Incumbent re-elected.
| nowrap | 

|-
! 
| John Bell
|  | Jacksonian
| 1827
| Incumbent re-elected.
| nowrap | 

|-
! 
| John H. Marable
|  | Jacksonian
| 1825
|  | Incumbent lost re-election.New member elected.Jacksonian hold.
| nowrap | 

|-
! 
| Davy Crockett
|  | Jacksonian
| 1827
|  | Incumbent re-elected to a different party.Anti-Jacksonian gain.
| nowrap | 

|}

Vermont 

Vermont elected its members September 2, 1828.  Vermont required a majority vote for election, so the  district election was settled on the second ballot on November 11, 1828, and the  district election was settled on the eighth ballot on November 2, 1829.

|-
! 
| Jonathan Hunt
|  | Anti-Jacksonian
| 1826
| Incumbent re-elected.
| nowrap | 

|-
! 
| Rollin C. Mallary
|  | Anti-Jacksonian
| 1818
| Incumbent re-elected.
| nowrap | 

|-
! 
| George E. Wales
|  | Anti-Jacksonian
| 1824
|  | Incumbent lost re-election.New member elected.Anti-Jacksonian hold.
| nowrap |  

|-
! 
| Benjamin Swift
|  | Anti-Jacksonian
| 1826
| Incumbent re-elected.
| nowrap | 

|-
! 
| Daniel A. A. Buck
|  | Anti-Jacksonian
| 18221824 1826
|  | Incumbent lost re-election.New member elected.Anti-Masonic gain.
| nowrap | 

|}

Virginia 

Virginia elected its members in April 1829 after the term began but before Congress convened.

|-
! 
| Thomas Newton Jr.
|  | Anti-Jacksonian
| 1801
| Incumbent re-elected.The election was later successfully contested.
| nowrap | 

|-
! 
| James Trezvant
|  | Jacksonian
| 1825
| Incumbent re-elected.
| nowrap | 

|-
! 
| William S. Archer
|  | Jacksonian
| 1820 
| Incumbent re-elected.
| nowrap | 

|-
! 
| Mark Alexander
|  | Jacksonian
| 1819
| Incumbent re-elected.
| nowrap | 

|-
! 
| John Randolph
|  | Jacksonian
| 17991812 18151817 18191825 1827
|  | Incumbent retired.New member elected.Jacksonian hold.
| nowrap | 

|-
! 
| Thomas Davenport
|  | Jacksonian
| 1825
| Incumbent re-elected.
| nowrap | 

|-
! 
| Nathaniel H. Claiborne
|  | Jacksonian
| 1825
| Incumbent re-elected.
| nowrap | 

|-
! 
| Burwell Bassett
|  | Jacksonian
| 18051812 18151819 1821
|  | Incumbent lost re-election.New member elected.Jacksonian hold.
| nowrap | 

|-
! 
| Andrew Stevenson
|  | Jacksonian
| 1821
| Incumbent re-elected.
| nowrap | 

|-
! 
| William C. Rives
|  | Jacksonian
| 1823
| Incumbent re-elected.
| nowrap | 

|-
! 
| Philip P. Barbour
|  | Jacksonian
| 1814 1825 1827
| Incumbent re-elected.
| nowrap | 

|-
! 
| John Roane
|  | Jacksonian
| 18091815 1827
| Incumbent re-elected.
| nowrap | 

|-
! 
| John Taliaferro
|  | Anti-Jacksonian
| 18011803 1811 1813 1824 
| Incumbent re-elected.
| nowrap | 

|-
! 
| Charles F. Mercer
|  | Anti-Jacksonian
| 1817
| Incumbent re-elected.
| nowrap | 

|-
! 
| John S. Barbour
|  | Jacksonian
| 1823
| Incumbent re-elected.
| nowrap | 

|-
! 
| William Armstrong
|  | Anti-Jacksonian
| 1825
| Incumbent re-elected.
| nowrap | 

|-
! 
| Robert Allen
|  | Jacksonian
| 1827
| Incumbent re-elected.
| nowrap | 

|-
! 
| Isaac Leffler
|  | Anti-Jacksonian
| 1827
|  | Incumbent retired.New member elected.Anti-Jacksonian hold.
| nowrap | 

|-
! 
| William McCoy
|  | Jacksonian
| 1811
| Incumbent re-elected.
| nowrap | 

|-
! 
| John Floyd
|  | Jacksonian
| 1817
|  | Incumbent retired.New member elected.Jacksonian hold.
| nowrap | 

|-
! 
| Lewis Maxwell
|  | Anti-Jacksonian
| 1827
| Incumbent re-elected.
| nowrap | 

|-
! 
| Alexander Smyth
|  | Jacksonian
| 18171825 1827
| Incumbent re-elected.
| nowrap | 

|}

Non-voting delegates 

|-
! 
| Ambrose H. Sevier
|  | None
| 1828 
| Incumbent re-elected.
| nowrap | 

|-
! 
| Joseph M. White
|  | Jacksonian
| 1824
| Incumbent re-elected.
| nowrap | 

|-
! 
| Austin E. Wing
|  | 
| 1824
| Retired
| nowrap | 

|}

See also
 1828 United States elections
 List of United States House of Representatives elections (1824–1854)
 1828 United States presidential election
 1828–29 United States Senate elections
 20th United States Congress
 21st United States Congress

Notes

References

Bibliography

External links
 Office of the Historian (Office of Art & Archives, Office of the Clerk, U.S. House of Representatives)

 
 
Second Party System